The Greater Antillean grackle (Quiscalus niger) is a grackle found throughout the Greater Antilles, as well as smaller nearby islands. Like all Quiscalus grackles, it is a rather large, gregarious bird. It lives largely in heavily settled areas.

Names
It is known as the 'kling-kling' and 'chinchilín' in the Dominican Republic, as 'ching ching' in the Cayman Islands and as a ‘chango’ in Puerto Rico. Most local names seem to derive from onomatopoeiac descriptions of the bird's calls.

Taxonomy
The Irish physician, naturalist and collector Hans Sloane stayed in Jamaica between 1687 and 1689. During his visit, he collected specimens and made notes on the plants and animals. Based on these notes, the ornithologist John Ray published a short description of the Greater Antillean grackle in 1713, using the Latin name Monedula tota nigra but it was not until 1725, more than 35 years after his visit, that Sloane himself published a description of the grackle. He reported that it was common on the road between St. Jago de la Vega (Spanish Town) and Passage-Fort (Portmore).

In 1775 the French polymath Georges-Louis Leclerc, Comte de Buffon described the Greater Antillean grackle in his Histoire Naturelle des Oiseaux. The bird was also illustrated in a hand-coloured plate engraved by François-Nicolas Martinet in the Planches Enluminées D'Histoire Naturelle which was produced under the supervision of Edme-Louis Daubenton to accompany Buffon's text.  Neither the plate caption nor Buffon's description included a scientific name but in 1783 the Dutch naturalist Pieter Boddaert coined the binomial name Oriolus niger in his catalogue of the Planches Enluminées. Buffon's specimen was probably collected in the French colony of Saint-Domingue which occupied the western end of what is now Haiti. In 1921 the American ornithologist James L. Peters restricted the type locality to Port-au-Prince in Haiti.

The Greater Antillean grackle is now one of seven species placed in the genus Quiscalus (six extant and one extinct), that was introduced by the French ornithologist Louis Jean Pierre Vieillot in 1816. The genus name is from the specific name Gracula quiscula coined by the Swedish naturalist Carl Linnaeus for the common grackle; the specific niger is Latin for "black".

There are seven subspecies, each restricted to one island or island group. They differ in body size, bill size, and colour tone.
 Q. n. niger – (Boddaert, 1783): the nominate subspecies, found on Hispaniola (Haiti and the Dominican Republic)
 Q. n. caribaeus – (Todd, 1916): found in western Cuba and on Isla de Juventud
 Q. n. gundlachii – Cassin, 1867: found in central and eastern Cuba
 Q. n. caymanensis – Cory, 1886: found on Grand Cayman Island
 Q. n. bangsi – (Peters, JL, 1921): found on Little Cayman Island
 Q. n. crassirostris – Swainson, 1838: found in Jamaica
 Q. n. brachypterus – Cassin, 1867: found in Puerto Rico

Description
The -long male is glossy black with a large rudder-like tail; the -long female has a smaller tail and is similar in color, but less glossy than the male. The eye is yellow and is the only non-black body part.
The Greater Antillean grackle is a generalist eater; it eats fruits, bread, plant matter, and both small vertebrates and invertebrates alike.

Gallery

See also

 Fauna of Puerto Rico
 List of Puerto Rican birds
 List of Vieques birds

References

External links

 
 
 
 
 

Greater Antillean Grackle
Birds of the Greater Antilles
Endemic birds of the Caribbean
Birds of the Dominican Republic
Birds of Haiti
Greater Antillean grackle
Greater Antillean grackle